Yucca coahuilensis (Coahuila soapwort) is a plant in the family Asparagaceae, native to grasslands of southern Texas and northern Coahuila. It has a basal rosette of stiff, very narrow leaves, and an inflorescence up to 2.5 m (8 feet) tall, bearing creamy white flowers.

References

External links
photo of herbarium specimen at Missouri Botanical Garden, isotype of Yucca coahuilensis
Plant Delights Nursery at Juniper Level Botanical Gardens, Yucca coahuilensis (Coahuila Soapwort) 
Yucca coahuilensis Matuda & Piña Luján
Rare Palm Seeds 'Yucca coahuilensis''

coahuilensis
Flora of Coahuila
Flora of Mexico
Flora of Texas